John Maury may refer to:
 John Walker Maury, mayor of the City of Washington
 John Minor Maury, lieutenant in the United States Navy

See also
 Maury John, American college basketball coach